Castilla was an  unprotected cruiser of the Spanish Navy that fought in the Battle of Manila Bay during the Spanish–American War. She was built at Cadiz, Spain. Her construction as an armored corvette with a central battery ironclad design began in 1869. In 1870, her design was changed to that of an unprotected cruiser or wooden corvette, and, after political events delayed her construction. During the first two years of the Philippine Revolution in 1896–1897, Castilla patrolled to intercept contraband destined for the Philippine insurgents and supported Spanish Army forces fighting ashore in Cavite Province on Luzon. When the Spanish–American War broke out in April 1898, Castilla was part of the squadron of Rear Admiral Patricio Montojo y Pasarón in Manila Bay and was subsequently engaged and sunk in the Battle of Manila Bay.

Technical characteristics
Castilla was built at Cadiz, Spain. In 1870, her design was changed to that of an unprotected cruiser or wooden corvette, and, after political events delayed her construction, she finally was launched in this form in 1881 and completed in 1882. Her original conception as an armored ship and the change to an unarmored one during construction left her with an overly heavy wooden hull that was obsolescent by the time of her launch.

She had two funnels and was rigged as a barque. Her machinery was manufactured at the naval shipyard at Ferrol. The original main battery of Armstrong-built  guns was obsolescent when she was completed, and were quickly replaced with more modern Krupp-built guns, with the  guns mounted in sponsons. Designed for colonial service, including intercepting contraband and pirates, she was never intended to fight a battle against heavily armed, armored, steel-hulled warships like she faced in the Battle of Manila Bay.

Operational history
Castilla was commissioned in 1882. She spent her early years in Spanish waters as a part of the Spanish Navy's Instructional Squadron, making several courtesy visits to Mediterranean ports.

On 7 March 1890, Capitán de navío (ship-of-the-line captain) Manuel de la Cámara took command of the Philippine Division, a naval force composed of Castilla and the unprotected cruisers  and  designated to reinforce the Spanish Navy′s Asiatic Squadron in the Philippines. The division departed Cádiz on 9 April 1890. Transiting the Mediterranean Sea, Suez Canal, and Indian Ocean, the division encountered rough weather during its journey only in the Gulf of Lyons. It called at Barcelona, Port Said, Suez, Aden, and Colombo before arriving at Singapore on 2 June 1890. The three cruisers resumed their voyage the next day and arrived at Manila on 17 June 1890. The voyage marked the first time that Castilla had ever ventured beyond the waters of the Mediterranean. In the Philippines, the division became known as the "Black Squadron" because its ships were painted black instead of white, as other Asiatic Squadron ships were. Although a captain, Cámara commanded the division with the title of "commodore" of the division until December 1890, when illness forced him to relinquish command.

After Cámara′s departure, Castilla stayed on in the Philippines. During the first two years of the Philippine Revolution in 1896–1897, referred to by colonial Spaniards as the "Tagalog Revolt", Castilla patrolled to intercept contraband destined for the Philippine insurgents and supported Spanish Army forces fighting ashore in Cavite Province on Luzon.

When the Spanish–American War broke out in April 1898, Castilla was part of the squadron of Rear Admiral Patricio Montojo y Pasarón in Manila Bay. At 1100 hours on 25 April 1898, Castilla and five other ships of the squadron set out for Subic Bay, where Montojo hoped to take advantage of minefields and shore batteries in the likely event of an attack by U.S. Navy forces on his squadron. During the voyage, Castilla began to take on water through her propeller shaft housing. Her machinery and boilers had been in such poor shape that she was capable only of low speed already, and the only method of stopping the flooding—plugging the hole with concrete—immobilized her propeller shaft, leaving her to rely on sails or towing for propulsion. Montojo's flagship, the unprotected cruiser , took her under tow.

Arriving at Subic Bay, Montojo found that few of the mines had been laid and the shore batteries had not yet been mounted. At 1030 hours on 29 April 1898, Montojo's ships departed Subic Bay to return to Manila Bay, where shore batteries could support Montojo's squadron and where the shallow water might reduce the loss of life if the Spanish ships were sunk; Castilla again was towed by Reina Cristina on this return voyage. Don Juan de Austria made a quick trip to Manila to procure small craft, such as lighters, small boats, and barges, to be tied up alongside Castilla to protect her wooden hull from hostile gunfire. Castilla also was sandbagged along the side exposed to enemy fire.

At 0400 hours on 1 May 1898, Montojo signaled the anchored squadron to prepare for imminent action. The U.S. Navy's Asiatic Squadron under Commodore George Dewey was sighted approaching the anchorage at 0445 hours. Castilla and the other Spanish ships opened fire at 0520 hours, beginning the Battle of Manila Bay, the first major action of the Spanish–American War.

Dewey's squadron made a series of slow firing passes at the Spanish squadron. Still unable to get underway, Castilla had to fight it out at anchor. She had not been repainted, and still sported her peacetime white sides and yellow funnels, making her an easy and attractive target for American gunners. At 0630 hours, Castilla had one  and one  gun disabled by an American shell hit, which also killed several of her crew. American shellfire cut her anchor cables, and she drifted to expose her unprotected side to Dewey's squadron. Three  hits started a large fire, which by 0715 had begun to destroy her deck, and she was ordered abandoned at 0830; Don Juan de Austria rendered assistance to Castilla under enemy fire.

Trophy cannon
In 1902, one of the breech-loading guns from Castilla was presented by Oscar F. Williams, U.S. Consul at Manila, to the city of Rochester, New York. It is currently located in Highland Park in Rochester. The Vermont State House features a pair of the same cannon, with an almost identical plaque, as decoration on the front lawn. The only difference in the plaque is the parts pertaining to the locality the gun was presented to.

See also
 Patricio Montojo y Pasaron

Notes

References
 Chesneau, Roger, and Eugene M. Kolesnik, eds. Conway's All The World's Fighting Ships 1860–1905. New York: Mayflower Books Inc., 1979. .
 Nofi, Albert A. The Spanish–American War, 1898. Conshohocken, Pennsylvania: Combined Books, 1996. .

External links
 The Spanish–American War Centennial Website: Castilla
 The Spanish–American War Centennial Website: Don Juan de Austria
 The Spanish–American War Centennial Website: Spanish Wooden Cruisers
 Department of the Navy: Naval Historical Center: Online Library of Selected Images: Spanish Navy Ships: Castilla (Cruiser, 1881–1898)

Aragon-class cruisers
Ships built in Spain
1881 ships
Spanish–American War cruisers of Spain
Maritime incidents in 1898
Shipwrecks of the Philippines
Shipwrecks in the South China Sea
Shipwrecks of the Spanish–American War